Thomas–Wiley–Johnson Farmstead is a historic home and farm located near Johnsonville, Rensselaer County, New York. The farmhouse was built between about 1790 and 1800, and consists of a two-story, five bay, Greek Revival style frame main block with a kitchen wing added about 1840.  It was remodeled about 1870, and has another wing added about the same time.  Also on the property are the contributing main barn group with cow barn and milk house additions (c. 1860-1960), hen house and corn crib (c. 1930, c. 1950), work shop (c. 1880-1900), and garage (c. 1950).

It was listed on the National Register of Historic Places in 2012.

References

Farms on the National Register of Historic Places in New York (state)
Greek Revival architecture in New York (state)
Houses completed in 1800
Buildings and structures in Rensselaer County, New York
National Register of Historic Places in Rensselaer County, New York